The Uniques may refer to:
The Uniques (Jamaican group), a vocal group
The Uniques (doo-wop group), a Chicago-based group
The Uniques (Louisiana band), a Louisiana-based rock group

See also

 Unique (disambiguation)